In anatomy and physiology, segmental stabilizers are the muscles which provide support across joints, as in the multifidus across spinal vertebrae.

In fitness
Segmental stabilizers align bones, such as the spine, so as to reduce stress during movement.  They are primarily enlisted during functional movement and balance training.

Muscular system